Robert Patrick McVey (born March 14, 1936 in Hartford, Connecticut) is an American ice hockey player. He won a gold medal at the 1960 Winter Olympics, bringing home the US's first Olympic Hockey Gold Medal while playing on the team's top line with Bill Cleary and Bob Cleary. He went to Harvard and then onto the Olympics after turning down a professional offer from the Boston Bruins to play for their top minor league team the Kingston Frontenacs (EPHL) in 1959. He lived in Hamden, Connecticut and now lives in Florida.

He attended Choate Rosemary Hall and graduated in the class of 1954.

References

External links
 

1936 births
American men's ice hockey defensemen
Harvard Crimson men's ice hockey players
Ice hockey players from Connecticut
Ice hockey players at the 1960 Winter Olympics
Living people
Medalists at the 1960 Winter Olympics
Olympic gold medalists for the United States in ice hockey
Sportspeople from Hartford, Connecticut